The International Society for the Study of Behavioural Development (ISSBD) is an international, multidisciplinary learned society dedicated to research on human development. It was established on May 31, 1969, at the University of Bonn in Bonn, West Germany. It has three associated publications: the International Journal of Behavioral Development, the ISSBD Bulletin, and a monthly e-newsletter. It was originally registered in Amsterdam, the Netherlands in 1972, with its constitution being ratified in July of that year; in February 1973, it received royal assent from the Queen of the Netherlands. As of 2018, it had over 1,100 members from 60 different countries.

ISSBD Fellows 
Elected fellows of the International Society for the Study of Behavioral Development are individuals whose work has exhibited sustained impact on the Developmental Science community.

References

External links

Psychology-related professional associations
Organizations established in 1969
1969 establishments in West Germany